The Knick is an American television drama series on Cinemax created by Jack Amiel and Michael Begler, directed by Steven Soderbergh and starring Clive Owen. It looks at the professional and personal lives of Dr. John W. Thackery (played by Owen) and the staff at a fictionalized version of the Knickerbocker Hospital ("the Knick") in New York during the early part of the twentieth century. The series premiered on Cinemax on August 8, 2014. In March 2017, Cinemax announced the series was officially cancelled.

Series overview

Episodes

Season 1 (2014)

Season 2 (2015)

References

External links 
 
 

Lists of American drama television series episodes